Desmodus stocki, or Stock's vampire bat, is an extinct species of vampire bat native to Pleistocene Florida, farther north than any living vampire bats.
It weighed about 50% more than the common vampire bat (Desmodus rotundus), and was also more robust.

References

stocki
Pleistocene bats
Pleistocene mammals of North America
Fossil taxa described in 1958
Mammals described in 1958
Vampire bats